ZNBN-FM is a radio station in Nassau, Bahamas broadcasting a Caribbean Music, Bahamian Junkanoo and rake-and-scrape radio format.

External links 

Radio stations in the Bahamas
Caribbean music